Alireza Ghasemi (Born 1990) is an Iranian screenwriter, film director and producer. He is known for directing the award-winning short films Lunch Time (2017), Better than Neil Armstrong (2019) and Extra Sauce (2020). Ghasemi's films have screened at several Academy-qualifying festivals. His short film Lunch Time received a nomination for the Short Film Palme d'Or at the 70th Annual Cannes Film Festival in 2017

Early life
Alireza Ghasemi was born in 1990. He began his education at the Film and Theater Department of Tehran University of Art in 2012. He received his MFA in filmmaking from Tehran University of Art and spent an exchange year at Film Academy Baden-Württemberg in Germany.

Career 
Ghasemi became the director of the 11th Nahal International Student Short Film Festival in 2014, and founded and directed the 1st Globe International Silent Film Festival in 2015. He is currently the president of the board of directors of the Globe International Silent Film Festival.

Filmography 
 Shortcut (2015)
 Frequency (2016)
 Lunch Time (2017)
 Better than Neil Armstrong (2019)
 Extra Sauce (2019)
 Arezo (2019)
 Solar Eclipse (2021)

Awards 
 Lunch Time: Nominated for the Short Film Palme d'Or at the 70th Annual Cannes Film Festival, 2017
 Frequency: Nominated for the Best Experimental Film, and Winner of the Best Editing award at 13th Nahal International Student Short Film Festival, 2016
 Shortcut: Winner of the Special Jury Committee Prize at 12th Nahal International Student Short Film Festival, 2015

References

External links 

Iranian film directors
Living people
1990 births
Tehran University of Art alumni